The UT Martin Skyhawks football program is the intercollegiate American football team for the University of Tennessee at Martin in Martin, Tennessee. The team competes in the NCAA Division I Football Championship Subdivision (FCS) and are members of the Ohio Valley Conference. The school's first football team was fielded in 1925, while known as Hall-Moody Junior College (later changing it to University of Tennessee Junior College in 1927, which they kept until 1950). The team plays its home games at the 7,500 seat Graham Stadium. They are coached by Jason Simpson.

UT Martin's official mascot became the Skyhawks in 1995. The school lists three references regarding the name, such as the fact that when the school's first site was a Bible institute, the school's athletic teams were called "sky pilots", a frontier term for preachers. During World War II, UT Junior College contracted with the Naval War Training Service to help train pilots, who completed their flight training at an airport now near a high school. Also, Red-tail hawks are indigenous to the west Tennessee region. The previous names of the athletic team were the Junior Volunteers and the Pacers.

History

Classifications
1961–1972: NCAA College Division
1973–1991: NCAA Division II
1992–present: NCAA Division I–AA/FCS

Conference memberships
1925–1927: Independent
1928–1950: Mississippi Valley Conference
1951–1970: Volunteer State Athletic Conference
1970–1971: Mid-South Athletic Conference
1972–1989: Gulf South Conference
1990–1991: NCAA Division II Independent
1992–present: Ohio Valley Conference

Conference championships
UT Martin has won six conference championships, four outright and two shared.

† denotes co-championship

Playoff appearances

NCAA Division I-AA/FCS
The Skyhawks have appeared in the FCS playoffs two times with an overall record of 1–2.

NCAA Division II
The Skyhawks have appeared in the Division II playoffs one time with an overall record of 1–1.

Notable former players
Notable alumni include:
 Romel Andrews
 Jeremy Butler
 Mark Guy
 Montori Hughes
 Leon Reed
 Jerry Reese
 Fred Thomas
 Ray Williams

Future non-conference opponents 
Announced schedules as of December 8, 2022.

References

External links
 

 
American football teams established in 1925
1925 establishments in Tennessee